The AIR Awards of 2012 (or Jägermeister Independent Awards of 2012) is the seventh annual Australian Independent Record Labels Association Music Awards (generally known as the AIR Awards) and was an award ceremony at Revolt Art Space, in Melbourne, Australia on 16 October 2012. The event was sponsored by German liquor brand, Jägermeister for the final time. 

This year was the first for the category, Best Independent Label, was taken by Sydney hip hop label Elefant Traks, who in the past year have released albums from The Herd, Urthboy, Hermitude, Sietta, The Last Kinection and Sky High.

Performers

Nominees and winners

AIR Awards
Winners are listed first and highlighted in boldface; other final nominees are listed alphabetically.

See also
Music of Australia

References

2012 in Australian music
2012 music awards
AIR Awards